"Piccadilly Circus" is a song written by Lars Andersson and Bruno Glenmark, and performed by Pernilla Wahlgren at Melodifestivalen 1985, where the song ended up fourth behind "Bra vibrationer", performed by Kikki Danielsson. The single peaked at second place at the Swedish singles chart. On 9 March 1985 the song entered Trackslistan. The song lyrics describe a love meeting at Piccadilly Circus. 

Wahlgren entered stage with the brothers Vito and Emilio Ingrosso as dancers. Wahlgren was later criticised for wearing an Iron Cross-like item on stage, which was referred to as Nazi propaganda.

A Framåt fredag parody version was called "Inga djur på cirkus", describing Miljöpartiet in 2005 asking for stop using  animals at circus shows in Sweden.

Charts

References

Information at Svensk mediedatabas

1985 songs
1985 singles
Melodifestivalen songs of 1985
Swedish-language songs
Pernilla Wahlgren songs
Songs about London